Prof David Gemmell McKinlay FRSE FICE FGS (1924–1997) was a Scottish civil engineer. He specialised in hydraulics and soil mechanics.

Life
He was born in Riddrie in eastern Glasgow on 23 August 1923. He was educated at Allan Glen's School in Glasgow. From 1941 to 1944 he studied Civil Engineering at Glasgow University graduating BSc and then doing further postgraduate research. This was concurrent with service in the Royal Navy in the Pacific as an Air Engineer Officer.

In  1946 he returned to Scotland and worked briefly for Dumfries County Council before taking up a role at the Royal Technical College. Here he worked for 40 years, including its transition into becoming Strathclyde University. He also was seconded to work with Babtie, Shaw and Morton. In 1972 he became the first Professor of Soil Mechanics.

From the 1960s he lived with his family in Bearsden and was an elder in the local church. In 1987 Rotary International awarded him a Paul Harris Fellowship for his work in India and Malawi.
In 1987 he was elected a Fellow of the Royal Society of Edinburgh. His proposers were Hugh B Sutherland, Prof Alexander Coull, William George Nicholson Geddes and John Atwell.

From 1994 he worked as a consultant at Crouch Hogg and Waterman in Glasgow.

He emigrated to Australia late in 1996 to be closer to his daughter, who lived there.
He died in Drysdale, Victoria on 4 March 1997.

Family

He was married to Muriel and had two children.

References

1924 births
1997 deaths
Engineers from Glasgow
People educated at Allan Glen's School
Scottish civil engineers
Alumni of the University of Glasgow
Academics of the University of Strathclyde
Fellows of the Royal Society of Edinburgh